"Go for Soda" is a song by Canadian singer Kim Mitchell. It was released in 1984 as the lead single from his first full-length solo album, Akimbo Alogo. The song reached number 22 in Canada and was Mitchell's only charting single on the Billboard Hot 100 in the United States, reaching number 86. It remains his best-known song outside of his native Canada.

In popular culture
The song served as the campaign theme for Mothers Against Drunk Drivers (MADD) in the United States. 

It was featured in the opening scene of the 1985 Miami Vice episode "Buddies" and popularized in a series of television commercials for the soft drink Mr. Pibb. More recently, that ad campaign was lampooned by American Dad!, in the episode "A.T. the Abusive Terrestrial". The song was later used in the Trailer Park Boys seventh-season episode "We Can't Call People Without Wings Angels So We Call Them Friends".

Music video
The music video was directed by Robert Bouvier.

Charts

Peak positions

References

1984 songs
1984 singles
Kim Mitchell songs
RPM Top Singles number-one singles
Songs with lyrics by Pye Dubois